Duran is a census-designated place in Torrance County, New Mexico, United States. As of the 2010 census, its population was 35.

Demographics

History
Duran was laid out in 1902 when the railroad was extended to that point. A post office has been in operation at Duran since 1902.

Education
Vaughn Municipal Schools is the local school district.

References

Census-designated places in Torrance County, New Mexico
Census-designated places in New Mexico
Albuquerque metropolitan area